Contino is an Italian surname. Notable people with the name include:

Dick Contino (1930–2017), American accordionist and singer
Fiora Contino (1925–2017), American opera conductor and teacher
Juan Contino Aslán (born 1960), city mayor of Havana, Cuba

See also
Contino real, a court appointment in Late Medieval Spain
The Contino Sessions, a 1999 album by British band Death in Vegas

Italian-language surnames